Megachile strandi is a species of bee in the family Megachilidae. It was described by Popov in 1936.

References

Strandi
Insects described in 1936